Ice calving, also known as glacier calving or iceberg calving, is the breaking of ice chunks from the edge of a glacier. It is a form of ice ablation or ice disruption. It is the sudden release and breaking away of a mass of ice from a glacier, iceberg, ice front, ice shelf, or crevasse. The ice that breaks away can be classified as an iceberg, but may also be a growler, bergy bit, or a crevasse wall breakaway.

The entry of the ice into the water causes large, and often hazardous waves. These events have become major tourist attractions in locations such as Alaska.

Many glaciers terminate at oceans or freshwater lakes which results naturally with the calving of large numbers of icebergs. Calving of Greenland's glaciers produce 12,000 to 15,000 icebergs each year alone.

Calving of ice shelves is often preceded by a rift. An ice shelf in steady state calves at roughly the same rate as the influx of new ice, and calving events may occur on subannual to decadal timescales to maintain an overall average mean position of the ice shelf front. When calving rates exceed the influx of new ice, ice front retreat occurs, and ice shelves may grow smaller and weaker.

Causes
 

It is useful to classify causes of calving into first, second, and third order processes.  First order processes are responsible for the overall rate of calving at the glacier scale.  The first order cause of calving is longitudinal stretching, which controls the formation of crevasses.  When crevasses penetrate the full thickness of the ice, calving will occur. Longitudinal stretching is controlled by friction at the base and edges of the glacier, glacier geometry and water pressure at the bed. These factors, therefore, exert the primary control on calving rate.

Second and third order calving processes can be considered to be superimposed on the first order process above, and control the occurrence of individual calving events, rather than the overall rate.  Melting at the waterline is an important second order calving process as it undercuts the subaerial ice, leading to collapse.  Other second order processes include tidal and seismic events, buoyant forces and melt water wedging.

When calving occurs due to waterline melting, only the subaerial part of the glacier will calve, leaving a submerged 'foot'.  Thus, a third order process is defined, whereby upward buoyant forces cause this ice foot to break off and emerge at the surface.  This process is extremely dangerous, as it has been known to occur, without warning, up to 300m from the glacier terminus.

Calving law

Though many factors that contribute to calving have been identified, a reliable predictive mathematical formula is still under development. Data is currently being assembled from ice shelves in Antarctica and Greenland to help establish a 'calving law'. Variables used in models include properties of the ice such as thickness, density, temperature, c-axis fabric, and impurity loading. A property known as 'ice front normal spreading stress' may be of key importance, despite it not normally being measured.

There are currently several concepts upon which to base a predictive law. One theory states that the calving rate is primarily a function of the ratio of tensile stress to vertical compressive stress, i.e., the calving rate is a function of the ratio of the largest to smallest principle stress. Another theory, based on preliminary research, shows that the calving rate increases as a power of the spreading rate near the calving front.

Major calving events

Filchner-Ronne Ice Shelf
In October, 1988, the A-38 iceberg broke away from the Filchner-Ronne Ice Shelf. It was about 150 km x 50 km. A second calving occurred in May 2000 and created an iceberg 167 km x 32 km.

Amery Ice Shelf
A major calving event occurred in 1962 to 1963. Currently, there is a section at the front of the shelf referred to as the 'loose tooth'. This section, about 30 km by 30 km is moving at about 12 meters per day and is expected to eventually calve away.

Ward Hunt Ice Shelf
The largest observed calving of an ice island happened at Ward Hunt Ice Shelf. Sometime between August 1961 and April 1962 almost 600 km2 of ice broke away.

Ayles Ice Shelf
In 2005, nearly the entire shelf calved from the northern edge of Ellesmere Island. Since 1900, about  90% of Ellesmere Island's ice shelves have calved and floated away. This event was the biggest of its kind for at least the past 25 years.

Larsen Ice Shelf
This large ice shelf, located in the Weddell Sea, extending along the east coast of Antarctic Peninsula, consists of three segments, two of which have calved. In January 1995, the Larsen A Ice Shelf containing 3,250 km2 of ice 220 m thick calved and disintegrated. Then the Larsen B Ice Shelf calved and disintegrated in February 2002.

Jakobshavn Isbrae Glacier
Also known as the Ilulissat Glacier or Sermeq Kujalleq in western Greenland, in an ongoing event, 35 billion tonnes of icebergs calve off and pass out of the fjord every year.

Photographer James Balog and his team were examining this glacier in 2008 when their cameras caught a piece of glacier the size of Lower Manhattan fall into the ocean. The calving event lasted for 75 minutes, during which time the glacier retreated a full mile across a calving face three miles (five kilometers) wide. Adam LeWinter and Jeff Orlowski captured this footage, which is featured in the film Chasing Ice.

Glacier surfing
First conceived in 1995 by Ryan Casey while filming for IMAX, this sport involves a surfer being towed into range by a jet ski and waiting for a mass of ice to calve from a glacier. Surfers can wait for several hours in the icy water for an event. When a glacier calves, the mass of ice can produce 8 metre waves. Rides of 300 metres lasting for one minute can be achieved.

See also

Ice sheet dynamics
Ice shelf
Glacier
Ablation

References

Further reading
 Holdsworth, G. 1971. Calving  From  Ward  Hunt  Ice  Shelf,  1961–1962., Canadian  Journal of Earth Sciences  8:299-305.
 Jeffries, M.  1982. Ward  Hunt  Ice Shelf, Spring 1982. Arctic 35542–544.
 Jeffries, M.O., And Serson, H.  1983. Recent  Changes At  The  Front Of Ward Nwt. Arctic 36:289-290. Hunt Ice Shelf, Ellesmere  Island, Koenig, L.S., Greenaway, K.R.,  Dunbar, M., And Haitersley
 Smith, G.  1952. Arctic  Ice  Islands.  Arctic  5:67-103.
 Lyons, J.B., And  Ragle,  R.H. 1962. Thermal  History  And  Growth  Of The Ward  Hunt  Ice Shelf. International  Union  Of Geodesy  And  Geophysics International Association Of Hydrological Sciences, Colloque D’obergurgl, 10–18 September 1962. 88–97.
 Rectic And Maykut, G.A., And  Untersteiner, N. 1971. Some Results From A Time Of Geophysical  Research Dependent  Thermodynamic  Model Of Sea Ice. Journal 761550–1575.

External links

University of Chicago article
"Chasing Ice" captures largest glacier calving ever filmed

Glaciers
Glaciology
Articles containing video clips